The 2013 Bilderberg Conference took place June 6–9, 2013, at The Grove hotel in Watford, Hertfordshire, England. It was the first Bilderberg Group conference to be held in the United Kingdom since the 1998 meeting in Turnberry, Scotland.

The Daily Telegraph likened the annual conference to "a political version of the World Economic Forum in Davos, Switzerland, which draws members of high society to discuss business and the economy." A British Member of Parliament and former Bilderberg attendee quoted by the Independent on Sunday also likened the annual conference to the World Economic Forum, and said it was "...not that exciting, in fact it's a bit run of the mill".

Around 140 participants are expected to participate in the meetings annually. Attendance to the event is by invitation only. No delegates pay to attend the conferences, and no delegates attend by conference phone or satellite. The conference programme never includes entertainment or performances.

The confidential nature of Bilderberg led to criticism of the group's lack of transparency and accountability, along with concerns about potential lobbying. Outside the 2013 meeting, Labour MP Michael Meacher said, "If there is any conference which required transparency, which required democratic accountability, it is the Bilderberg conference because this is really where the top brass of Western finance capitalism meet ... including government ministers." Conservative MP Douglas Carswell was also concerned about the privacy of the meetings, by saying "...you would have thought the least our ruling elite could do is discuss these issues in public."

There has also been speculation from conspiracy theorists about the purpose of the meetings. The secretive approach to staging the conferences has led to the younger generation of Bilderberg attendees being uncomfortable with the policy of total media exclusion, as reported by the Independent on Sunday. A previous attendee told the Independent that he sympathised with "those who tell us the confidentiality policy only encourages the conspiracy theorists. It does."

Of the format and outcome of the conference, the Bilderberg website said, "There is no detailed agenda, no resolutions are proposed, no votes are taken, and no policy statements are issued."

A Bilderberg Fringe Festival was held near the conference. The festival featured speakers, comedy, music, workshops, arts and entertainment.

The Prime Minister of the United Kingdom, David Cameron, attended the conference on 7 June. Cameron attended in a private capacity and was not accompanied by civil servants, even though it is customary for the Prime Minister to be accompanied by civil servants when he meets business leaders.

Press coverage
Journalists were banned from attending the event, with the exception of Lilli Gruber, although a press office was provided by the Bilderberg Group. The group is represented by a German corporate communications firm.

The meeting was well covered by the British media, with frequent Bilderberg writer Charlie Skelton noting the presence of Reuters, the Associated Press, Channel 4 News, The Times and the Press Association.

Agenda
A list of key topics for discussion at the 2013 Bilderberg conference was published on the Bilderberg website shortly before the meeting. Topics for discussion included:

 "Can the U.S. and Europe grow faster and create jobs?"
 "Jobs, entitlement and debt"
 "How big data is changing almost everything"
 "Nationalism and populism"
 "U.S. foreign policy"
 "Africa's challenges"
 "Cyber warfare and the proliferation of asymmetric threats"
 "Major trends in medical research"
 "Online education: promise and impacts"
 "Politics of the European Union"
 "Developments in the Middle East"

Delegates (alphabetical)

For the first time, a list of expected delegates was published by the Bilderberg Group.

 Paul Achleitner, Chairman of the Supervisory Board, Deutsche Bank
 Josef Ackermann, Chairman of the Board, Zurich Insurance Group
 Marcus Agius, former Chairman, Barclays
 Helen Alexander, Chairman, UBM plc
 Roger C. Altman, Executive Chairman, Evercore Partners
 Matti Apunen, Director, Finnish Business and Policy Forum EVA
 Susan Athey, Professor of Economics, Stanford Graduate School of Business
 Aslı Aydıntaşbaş, columnist, Milliyet
 Ali Babacan, Turkish Deputy Prime Minister for Economic and Financial Affairs
 Ed Balls, Shadow Chancellor of the Exchequer
 Francisco Pinto Balsemão, Chairman and CEO, Impresa
 Nicolas Barré, Managing Editor, Les Echos
 José Manuel Barroso, President, European Commission
 Nicolas Baverez, Partner, Gibson, Dunn & Crutcher
 Olivier de Bavinchove, Commander, Eurocorps
 John Bell, Regius Professor of Medicine, University of Oxford
 Franco Bernabè, Chairman and CEO, Telecom Italia
 Jeff Bezos, founder and CEO, Amazon
 Carl Bildt, Swedish Minister for Foreign Affairs
 Anders Borg, Swedish Minister for Finance
 Jean-François van Boxmeer, CEO, Heineken
 Svein Richard Brandtzæg, President and CEO, Norsk Hydro
 Oscar Bronner, publisher, Der Standard Medienwelt
 Peter Carington, 6th Baron Carrington, former Honorary Chairman, Bilderberg Meetings
 Juan Luis Cebrián, Executive Chairman, PRISA
 Edmund Clark, President and CEO, Toronto-Dominion Bank
 Kenneth Clarke, Cabinet Minister
 Bjarne Corydon, Danish Minister of Finance
 Sherard Cowper-Coles, Business Development Director, International, BAE Systems
 Étienne Davignon, Belgian Minister of State; Former Chairman, Bilderberg Meetings
 Ian Davis, Senior Partner Emeritus, McKinsey & Company
 Robbert Dijkgraaf, Director and Leon Levy Professor, Institute for Advanced Study
 Haluk Dinçer, President, Retail and Insurance Group, Sabancı Holding
 Robert Dudley, Group Chief Executive, BP
 Nicholas Eberstadt, Henry Wendt Chair in Political Economy, American Enterprise Institute
 Espen Barth Eide, Norwegian Minister of Foreign Affairs
 Börje Ekholm, President and CEO, Investor AB
 Thomas Enders, CEO, EADS
 Michael Evans, Vice Chairman, Goldman Sachs
 Ulrik Federspiel, Executive Vice President, Haldor Topsøe
 Martin Feldstein, Professor of Economics, Harvard University; President Emeritus, National Bureau of Economic Research
 François Fillon, former French Prime Minister
 Mark Fishman, President, Novartis Institutes for BioMedical Research
 Douglas Flint, Group Chairman, HSBC
 Paul Gallagher, Senior Counsel
 Timothy Geithner, Former Secretary of the Treasury
 Michael Gfoeller, US Political Consultant
 Donald Graham, Chairman and CEO, The Washington Post Company
 Ulrich Grillo, CEO, Grillo-Werke AG
 Lilli Gruber, journalist - Anchorwoman, La 7 TV
 Luis de Guindos, Spanish Minister of Economy and Competitiveness
 Stuart Gulliver, Group Chief Executive, HSBC
 Felix Gutzwiller, Member of the Swiss Council of States
 Victor Halberstadt, Professor of Economics, Leiden University; Former Honorary Secretary General of Bilderberg Meetings
 Olli Heinonen, Senior Fellow, Belfer Center for Science and International Affairs, Harvard Kennedy School of Government
 Simon Henry, CFO, Royal Dutch Shell
 Paul Hermelin, Chairman and CEO, Capgemini
 Pablo Isla, Chairman and CEO, Inditex
 Kenneth M. Jacobs, Chairman and CEO, Lazard
 James A. Johnson, Chairman, Johnson Capital Partners
 Thomas Jordan, Chairman of the Governing Board, Swiss National Bank
 Vernon E. Jordan, Jr., Managing Director, Lazard
 Robert D. Kaplan, Chief Geopolitical Analyst, Stratfor
 Alex Karp, founder and CEO, Palantir Technologies
 John Kerr, Independent Member, House of Lords
 Henry A. Kissinger, Chairman, Kissinger Associates
 Klaus Kleinfeld, Chairman and CEO, Alcoa
 Klaas Knot, President, De Nederlandsche Bank
 Mustafa Koç, Chairman, Koç Holding
 Roland Koch, CEO, Bilfinger
 Henry Kravis, Co-Chairman and Co-CEO, Kohlberg Kravis Roberts
 Marie-Josée Kravis, Senior Fellow and Vice Chair, Hudson Institute
 André Kudelski, Chairman and CEO, Kudelski Group
 Ulysses Kyriacopoulos, Chairman, S&B Industrial Minerals
 Christine Lagarde, Managing Director, International Monetary Fund
 Kurt Lauk, Chairman of the Economic Council to the CDU, Berlin
 Lawrence Lessig, Roy L. Furman Professor of Law and Leadership, Harvard Law School
 Thomas Leysen, Chairman of the Board of Directors, KBC Bank
 Christian Lindner, Party Leader, Free Democratic Party (FDP NRW)
 Stefan Löfven, Party Leader, Social Democratic Party (SAP)
 Peter Löscher, President and CEO, Siemens
 Peter Mandelson, Chairman, Global Counsel; Chairman, Lazard
 Jessica T. Mathews, President, Carnegie Endowment for International Peace
 Frank McKenna, Chair, Brookfield Asset Management
 John Micklethwait, Editor-in-Chief, The Economist
 Thierry de Montbrial, President, French Institute for International Relations
 Mario Monti, former Italian Prime Minister
 Craig Mundie, Senior Advisor to the CEO, Microsoft
 Alberto Nagel, CEO, Mediobanca
 Princess Beatrix of The Netherlands
 Andrew Ng, co-founder, Coursera
 Jorma Ollila, Chairman, Royal Dutch Shell
 David Omand, Visiting Professor, King's College London
 George Osborne, British Chancellor of the Exchequer
 Emanuele Ottolenghi, Senior Fellow, Foundation for Defense of Democracies
 Soli Özel, Senior Lecturer, Kadir Has University; Columnist, Habertürk
 Alexis Papahelas, Executive Editor, Kathimerini
 Şafak Pavey, Turkish MP
 Valérie Pécresse, French MP
 Richard Perle, Resident Fellow, American Enterprise Institute
 David H. Petraeus, General, United States Army (Retired)
 Paulo Portas, Portugal Minister of State and Foreign Affairs
 Robert Prichard, Chair, Torys
 Viviane Reding, Vice President and Commissioner for Justice, Fundamental Rights and Citizenship, European Commission
 Heather Reisman, CEO, Indigo Books & Music
 Hélène Rey, Professor of Economics, London Business School
 Simon Robertson, Partner, Robertson Robey Associates; Deputy Chairman, HSBC
 Gianfelice Rocca, Chairman, Techint
 Jacek Rostowski, Minister of Finance and Deputy Prime Minister
 Robert Rubin, Co-Chairman, Council on Foreign Relations; Former Secretary of the Treasury
 Mark Rutte, Dutch Prime Minister
 Andreas Schieder, Austrian State Secretary of Finance
 Eric Schmidt, Executive Chairman, Google
 Rudolf Scholten, Member of the Board of Executive Directors, Oesterreichische Kontrollbank
 António José Seguro, Secretary General, Portuguese Socialist Party
 Jean-Dominique Senard, CEO, Michelin
 Kristin Skogen Lund, Director General, Confederation of Norwegian Enterprise
 Anne-Marie Slaughter, Bert G. Kerstetter '66 University Professor of Politics and International Affairs, Princeton University
 Peter Sutherland, Chairman, Goldman Sachs
 Martin Taylor, Former Chairman, Syngenta
 Tidjane Thiam, Group CEO, Prudential
 Peter A. Thiel, President, Thiel Capital
 Craig B. Thompson, President and CEO, Memorial Sloan Kettering Cancer Center
 Jakob Topsøe, Partner, AMBROX Capital
 Jutta Urpilainen, Finnish Minister of Finance
 Daniel Vasella, Honorary Chairman, Novartis
 Peter Voser, CEO, Royal Dutch Shell
 Brad Wall, Premier of Saskatchewan, Canada
 Jacob Wallenberg, Chairman, Investor AB
 Kevin Warsh, Distinguished Visiting Fellow, Hoover Institution, Stanford University
 Galen Weston, Executive Chairman, Loblaw Companies
 Baroness Williams of Crosby, Member of the House of Lords
 Martin Wolf, Chief Economics Commentator, Financial Times
 James D. Wolfensohn, Chairman and CEO, Wolfensohn and Company
 David Wright, Vice Chairman, Barclays
 Robert Zoellick, Distinguished Visiting Fellow, Peterson Institute for International Economics

Policing
A private security company provided security at the hotel; in addition, the Bilderberg Group agreed to contribute toward the policing costs of the event. The local police force, Hertfordshire Police, were in talks with the Home Office about a grant for potential "unexpected or exceptional costs". The grant is provided if the costs threaten the "stability of their policing budget". A combined force of Hertfordshire, Bedfordshire, and Cambridge constabularies prepared for the conference, with the assistance of specialist officers from the Metropolitan Police. Five rugby pitches belonging to the Fullerians RFC were hired by police for the duration of the event. The police operation for the Bilderberg conference was called Operation Discuss, and had been running for eighteen months prior to the start of the conference. The cost of policing was revealed after the conference to have been in the region of £1.3 million, with £500,000 having been offered to the police by the Bilderberg Group.

The mayor of Watford, Dorothy Thornhill, said that she had concerns that the conference "does attract people who can and do cause violence and disturbance" but was confident that the police will "be able to minimise that and give them their right to protest". She was additionally "ambivalent about whether this is a good thing. It's potentially a positive thing as long as things don't kick off."

References

External links
  Official website of the Bilderberg conference
Bilderberg 2013 - unofficial site
Bilderberg Fringe Festival

2013 in the United Kingdom
2013
History of Watford